Jonathan Wood (born October 25, 1981) is an American former professional stock car racing driver. He is the grandson of Glen Wood, one of the famous Wood Brothers who founded what has become the NASCAR Cup Series' longest continuously active team.

Early career

Wood was given his first go kart as a child by Dale Jarrett, the Wood Brothers' driver at the time. After racing go-karts, he moved up to stock cars, racing in the USAR Hooters Pro Cup Series and the NASCAR Winston West Series. Wood made his NASCAR debut in the 2001 Craftsman Truck Series at Martinsville Speedway, driving the #15 Ford F-150 for Billy Ballew Motorsports. He started and finished 31st after suffering rear end failures. The release of Chuck Hossfeld allowed Wood to drive Roush Racing's #50 Eldon Ford for the rest of the year. He claimed a pair of top five finishes (Kansas and Fontana) in his limited appearances. In 2002, Jon ran the entire schedule, earning ten top-10s with sponsorship from the United States Navy. That year, he made his Busch Series debut at IRP, subbing for Jeff Burton in the #9 Gain Ford Taurus. He started and finished 6th that day.

In 2003, Wood notched two poles, 10 top fives and 20 top ten finishes, including two wins on his way to a fifth-place standing in the Craftsman Truck Series points. He ran most of the season with sponsored by Bob Graham. He ran his second Busch race that season at the Ford 300 in the #15 for ppc Racing. He finished 22nd. Unfortunately, the 2004 Craftsman Truck Series season was a struggle for Wood, who was forced to run unsponsored for virtually the entire season.

2005–2008

Wood moved to NASCAR's Busch Series full-time in 2005, driving for ST Motorsports (which later merged with the Wood Brothers to form Wood Brothers/JTG in 2006.) Wood had two top-fives and finished fifteenth in points, finishing fourth in the Rookie of the Year standings. In August 2005, Wood was released from his development contract with Roush Racing and became a member of the Wood Brothers driver development program. Wood had one top-five finish in 2006 and moved up one spot in the standings.

Originally, plans called for Wood to move up to Nextel Cup full-time in 2007; however, because of sponsor issues and the need for more experience, Wood ran only a partial schedule during the 2007 Nextel Cup season. Wood was to continue to drive full-time in the #47 Clorox-sponsored Ford Fusion in the Busch Series but was pulled from the ride following medical issues. He spent the rest of the season back in the Truck Series in the #21 Ford and had six top-tens in eleven starts as well as a pole position. He shared the #21 truck in 2008 with his cousin Keven but only had two top-ten finishes. He also made three Sprint Cup starts that season but failed to finish higher than 33rd. At the end of the season, the truck team for which Woods was running closed down and he has not raced since late 2010.

After retiring from racing, Wood now serves as the Senior Vice President (formerly the Director of Business Development) for Wood Brothers Racing where he actively participates in the day to day operations of the company’s merchandising and business development.

Motorsports career results

NASCAR
(key) (Bold – Pole position awarded by qualifying time. Italics – Pole position earned by points standings or practice time. * – Most laps led.)

Sprint Cup Series

Busch Series

Craftsman Truck Series

Winston West Series

References

External links
 WoodBrothersRacing.com Official website
 

1981 births
Living people
NASCAR drivers
CARS Tour drivers
People from Stuart, Virginia
Racing drivers from Virginia
RFK Racing drivers